The 1964 Major League Baseball All-Star Game was the 35th midseason exhibition between the all-stars of the American League (AL) and the National League (NL), the two leagues comprising Major League Baseball. The game was played on July 7, 1964, at Shea Stadium in New York City, New York, home of the New York Mets of the National League. The game was a 7–4 victory for the NL. Johnny Callison hit a walk-off home run, the most recent MLB All-Star game to end in such a fashion.

Game summary
National League starter Don Drysdale gave up a leadoff single to Jim Fregosi, who scored on a passed ball and single by Harmon Killebrew.

The NL took the lead in the fourth on a pair of home runs by Billy Williams and Ken Boyer off AL reliever John Wyatt, then made it 3–1 in the fifth on a Roberto Clemente single and Dick Groat double off Camilo Pascual.

The score was tied in the sixth when Mickey Mantle and Killebrew singled and scored on a Brooks Robinson triple to right-center. The AL regained the lead 4–3 in the seventh. Elston Howard was hit by a pitch by Turk Farrell, took third on a Rocky Colavito double and scored on Fregosi's sacrifice fly.

It remained 4–3 until the bottom of the ninth. Dick Radatz issued a leadoff walk to Willie Mays, who stole second. Orlando Cepeda singled him home with the tying run and took second on an error. With Curt Flood pinch-running for Cepeda and Johnny Edwards on first with an intentional walk, Johnny Callison's three-run homer to deep right field ended the game.

Roster
Players in italics have since been inducted into the National Baseball Hall of Fame.

American League

National League

x – replaced due to injury

y – replacement for injured player

Game

Starting lineups

Umpires

Line score

External links
Baseball Almanac
Baseball-Reference.com

Major League Baseball All-Star Game
Major League Baseball All-Star Game
Sports in Queens, New York
Major League Baseball All-Star Game
Major League Baseball All-Star Game
Baseball competitions in New York City
1960s in Queens